are areas of national forest in Japan so designated in an effort to conserve biodiversity. Japan's Protected Forest system includes three categories of protected forests: Forest Biosphere Reserves; Biotic Community Protection Forests; and Rare Population Protection Forests. Some of these national forests are linked by a network of Green Corridors that are also included in the system. Established in 1915, the system was overhauled in 2015 and expanded in 2019.

Background
In terms of ownership, 58% of all forest is in private hands, state-owned  represent 30%, with the remaining 12% otherwise publicly owned, by prefectural and municipal governments, etc.

Protected Forests date back to an ordinance of Taishō 4 (1915), with the first such forest established the following year, in Kamikōchi. Demand for timber increased with post-war reconstruction, and the area protected had significantly decreased by the late 1950s and continued to fall through the 1960s. In 1972, the Forestry Agency issued a new Protected Forest management plan, and in 1973 the area under protection increased 150%.

In 2015, a century after their institution, the Protected Forest system was revised, with the categories reduced from seven to three: (1) Forest Biosphere Reserve; (2) Biotic Community Protection Forest; and (3) Rare Population Protection Forest. As of 1 April 2019, a network of 24 Green Corridors, established to connect Protected Forests and facilitate interaction between discrete populations, represented a further  of national forest.

Protected Forests

Forest Biosphere Reserves
Of these, four are also inscribed on the UNESCO World Heritage List as Natural World Heritage Sites: Shiretoko, Shirakami-Sanchi, Ogaswara Islands, and Yakushima, while Amami Islands, Yanbaru, and Iriomote have been nominated for joint inscription and are currently on the Tentative List.

Biotic Community Protection Forests

Rare Population Protection Forests

Green Corridors

See also
 Ministry of Agriculture, Forestry and Fisheries (Japan)
 100 Terraced Rice Fields of Japan
 Flora of Japan

Notes

References

External links
  Links to regional Protected Forest listings

Protected areas of Japan
Forestry in Japan